Ranegras Plain is a plain in the eastern part of La Paz County, Arizona.

The Ranegras Plain is bounded by the Eagletail Mountains, Little Harquahala Mountains, Granite Wash Mountains and Bouse Hills to the northeast and to the southeast by the Plomosa, New Water and Little Horn Mountains.

References

Plains of Arizona